The 2017 Australian Grand Prix (formally known as the 2017 Formula 1 Rolex Australian Grand Prix) was a Formula One motor race that took place on 26 March 2017 in Melbourne. The race was contested over fifty-seven laps of the Melbourne Grand Prix Circuit and was the first round of the 2017 FIA Formula One World Championship. The race marked the 82nd race in the combined history of the Australian Grand Prix – which dates back to the 100 Miles Road Race of 1928 – and the 22nd time the event was held at the Melbourne Grand Prix Circuit. The reigning World Champion Nico Rosberg was the winner of the 2016 race, but he did not defend his win as he retired from the sport after the 2016 season.

Mercedes driver Lewis Hamilton started the race from pole, matching Ayrton Senna's record of six pole positions in Australia. Sebastian Vettel won the race, which was his and Ferrari's first win since the 2015 Singapore Grand Prix. Hamilton finished second, with Valtteri Bottas completing the podium in third on his début for Mercedes.

The race was also Ferrari's first win in Australia since the 2007 edition.

Report

Background

Circuit modifications
With the technical regulations undergoing a revision for the 2017 season, the FIA requested that every circuit on the calendar undergo revisions to update safety features. Organisers of the race introduced Tecpro barriers to the run-off areas at the fastest points of the circuit, and re-profiled tyre barriers.

Driver changes
Before the beginning of the third free practice session, Sauber announced that Pascal Wehrlein would not start the race. Wehrlein had sustained a back injury in an accident at the Race of Champions during the winter pre-season. Although Wehrlein was certified as fit to take part in the Grand Prix ahead of the first practice session, he withdrew as a precaution, citing the increased physical demands of the 2017 specification of cars and the lack of sustained running during pre-season testing as compromising his ability to complete a full race distance. He was replaced by Antonio Giovinazzi for the third session, qualifying and the race.

Lance Stroll made his Formula One début with Williams. Giovinazzi and Stroll were the only rookies in the field, with Stoffel Vandoorne at McLaren starting his first full season in the sport after a one-off appearance at the 2016 Bahrain Grand Prix and Esteban Ocon at Force India starting his first full season in the sport after starting the last 9 races of the  season.

Tyres
Pirelli supplied the teams with ultrasoft, supersoft and soft tyres. Usually, teams are allowed to choose an individual selection of thirteen different sets for every driver. However, due to the selection deadline falling before the pre-season test when teams were first able to drive with the new compounds, Pirelli allocated every driver the same sets. These were seven sets of ultrasoft, four sets of supersoft and two sets of soft tyres.

Qualifying

Notes
  – Daniel Ricciardo and Lance Stroll received five-place grid penalties for unscheduled gearbox changes.

Race
Sebastian Vettel claimed his first win since 2015 after beating both the Mercedes drivers, Lewis Hamilton and Valtteri Bottas, in a straight fight, Hamilton was not helped after he was held up for several laps behind Max Verstappen, the latter revealing he completed the race without a drinks bottle after the Red Bull team forgot to fit it in the car. Daniel Ricciardo's car failed on the way to the grid, eventually he joined the race on the 2nd lap but then retired on lap 26, he said afterwards he was sent out "to have some fun".

Race classification 

Notes
 – Daniel Ricciardo started the race from pit lane after his car stopped on the way to the grid and could not be restarted in time for the formation lap.

Championship standings after the race

Drivers' Championship standings

Constructors' Championship standings

 Note: Only the top five positions are included for both sets of standings.

See also
 2017 Coates Hire Supercars Challenge

References

External links

Australian
2017
Grand Prix
2010s in Melbourne
Motorsport in Melbourne
March 2017 sports events in Australia